Michael Tansi Memorial Secondary School is a mission school, owned specifically by the Onitsha Archdiocese of the Roman Catholic Mission, and is situated in Aguleri, Nigeria. The school derives its name from the deceased Blessed Cyprian Iwene Tansi, who hails from Aguleri and doubles as the school's patron Saint. The current priest in charge of the school is Rev. Fr. Michael Adichie.

Academic achievements 
The school has been ranked as the best school in the region and has featured and excelled in both internal and external competitions. It won the Archbishop Valerian Okeke Science Competition for Aguleri Region with excellent performances in both the Senior and Junior Categories.

Facilities 
The school has the following facilities;
 A well–stocked library
 computer laboratory
 Science laboratories
 Classrooms
 School bus
 Sporting equipment and facilities

Motto 
The school's motto is  Knowledge And Fear Of God.

Statistics 
The school has nearly 700 students and admits nearly a hundred students per term.

References

Education in Anambra State
Roman Catholic secondary schools in Nigeria